"If I Didn't Love You" is a song written by Jon Vezner and Jack White, and recorded by American country music artist Steve Wariner.  It was released in July 1993 as the first single from the album Drive.  The song reached #8 on the Billboard Hot Country Singles & Tracks chart.

Chart performance

Year-end charts

References

1993 singles
Steve Wariner songs
Song recordings produced by Scott Hendricks
Arista Nashville singles
Music videos directed by Deaton-Flanigen Productions
1993 songs
Songs written by Jon Vezner